Melissa Mulloy (born March 16, 1978, in Danvers, Massachusetts) is an American sport shooter. She competed at the 2000 Summer Olympics in the women's 50 metre rifle three positions event, in which she placed eighth.

References

1978 births
Living people
People from Danvers, Massachusetts
Sportspeople from Essex County, Massachusetts
ISSF rifle shooters
American female sport shooters
Shooters at the 2000 Summer Olympics
Olympic shooters of the United States
Pan American Games medalists in shooting
Pan American Games silver medalists for the United States
Shooters at the 2003 Pan American Games
20th-century American women
21st-century American women